Tiruppur is a 2010 Indian Tamil language romantic action film directed by M. C. Duraisamy. The film stars Prabha, Udhai and newcomer Unni Maya, with Sarvamathi, Padmakumar, Dhandapani, Mahanadi Shankar and Tiruppur Selvaraj playing supporting roles. The film, produced by R. Dharmaraj, had musical score by C. D. Shaju and was released on 10 September 2010.

Plot

The film begins with Kesavan (Udhai), after serving a prison sentence, being on a train back home to Palani, and he reminisces about his past.

Aadhi (Prabha), Kesavan, Perumal (Sarvamathi) and Seenu (Padmakumar) were best friends living in Palani. Aadhi lived with his widow mother and worked in a small workshop, while Kesavan lived with his wealthy family, and he was jobless. One day, Kesavan scolded Aparanji (Unni Maya) at the hospital for not doing her job well, but later, he felt guilty for insulting her and wanted to apologize. Thereafter, he came to know that Aparanji was a medical student who was on an educational trip in Palani, and they eventually befriended him. Aadhi, Perumal and Seenu urged Kesavan to express his love. Kesavan then accommodated Aparanji and her college mates in his house. Kesavan was still afraid of expressing his love, but Aparanji finally came to know about it, and she gave him a love letter before going to her native town Tiruppur.

The four friends arrived in Pollachi to attend their friend's wedding, and Kesavan met Aparanji before the function. At a jewellery shop, Kesavan bought bangles for his lover with his friend Aadhi and a police inspector (Mahanadi Shankar) suspected him of stealing his wife's bangles. The situation degenerated as Aadhi beat the police inspector up and Aparanji's father Subramani (Dhandapani) had witnessed the fight. At the wedding function, Kesavan gifted Aparanji the bangles. Subramani, who has seen it, insulted him and challenged Kesavan to come to his hometown Tiruppur.

In Tiruppur, Aadhi challenged Subramani in his house that his friend Kesavan will marry Aparanji, but their first attempt failed as Thirthagiri (Tiruppur Selvaraj) intervened. Later, Subramani explained to the four friends that the gangster Thirthagiri wanted him to give his daughter to his brother, but Subramani refused. Subramani wanted Kesavan to save Aparanji from Thirthagiri by marrying her. Thereafter, the four friends and Aparanji were arrested by the vengeful police inspector, and he took them to Thirthagiri's factory. The five managed to escape from Thirthagiri's henchmen. After getting separated, the friends who had defeated Thirthagiri's henchmen got together, and they had a brutal fight with Thirthagiri. When Thirthagiri tried to kill Kesavan with a machete, Aadhi sacrificed his life and died. A vengeful Kesavan then killed Thirthagiri.

Back to the present, Kesavan arrives in Palani, and he meets his lover Aparanji and his two friends.

Cast

Prabha as Aadhi
Udhai as Kesavan
Unni Maya as Aparanji
Sarvamathi as Perumal
Padmakumar as Seenu
Dhandapani as Subramani
Mahanadi Shankar as the Police inspector
Tiruppur Selvaraj as Thirthagiri
Sridhar
Rajguru
S. M. Shanmugam
Usha Elizabeth as Aparanji's mother
Janaki
Archana Harish as Kavitha
Kovai Desingu as Thirthagiri's henchman
Ramamoorthy
Knockout Nanda
Chinrasu as Gurukkal

Production
M. C. Duraisamy made his directorial debut with Tiruppur under the banner of Friends Production. Udhai who made his acting debut with Ganapathy Vanthachi (2006) and Prabha who acted in Pirappu (2007) and Thozhi (2009) were selected to play the lead roles. Unni Maya from Kerala was chosen to play the heroine. The film was predominantly shot in Tiruppur and two songs were canned in the Andaman Islands.

Soundtrack

The soundtrack was composed by C. D. Shaju. The soundtrack features 5 tracks written by Palani Bharathi and M. C. Duraisamy.

Reception
A critic said, "There is a sense of déjà-vu throughout the film reminding you of many similar ones [..] What the director has managed to convey is the friendship factor, especially the deep bonding between Adhi and Keshavan. Rising heroes Prabha and Udhai essay their characters with total involvement and conviction and play a major part in bringing out this friendship factor effectively on-screen".

References

2010 films
2010s Tamil-language films
Indian romantic action films
2010s romantic action films
2010 directorial debut films